Alexander III may refer to:

 Alexander III of Macedon (356 BC – 323 BC), also known as Alexander the Great
 Alexander (Byzantine emperor) (870–913), Byzantine emperor
 Pope Alexander III (1100s–1181)
 , grand duke of Vladimir (1328–1331), prince of Suzdal
 Alexander III of Scotland (1241–1286), king of Scotland
 Alexander III of Imereti (1609–1660), king of Imereti
 Alexander III of Russia (1845–1894), emperor of Russia
 , an arch bridge that spans the Seine in Paris
 Russian battleship , Russian warship
Alexander III of Antioch (1869–1958), Greek Orthodox patriarch of Antioch

See also 
 King Alexander (disambiguation)